Art In Island: 3D Art Gallery is an interactive art exhibition, or "selfie museum", in Cubao in Quezon City, Metro Manila, Philippines.

History
Art in Island is an interactive art exhibition, or "selfie museum" in Cubao, Quezon City Art In Island was founded by South Korean businessman Yun Jae Kyoung with the initial exhibits completed within four months by 14 Korean visual artists. It opened in November 2014.

Facilities and exhibits
Marketed as the "biggest 3D museum in Asia", exhibits are primarily murals which relies on optical illusion which causes the two-dimensional works to be perceived as "3D". Visitors are encouraged to photograph themselves to become "part" of the works' composition. In 2015, Art In Island had around 100 unique paintings including works derived from the Mona Lisa by Leonardo Da Vinci and The Scream by Edvard Munch.

See also
Dessert Museum

References

External links

Museums in Quezon City
Buildings and structures in Quezon City
Art museums and galleries in the Philippines
Visual arts exhibitions
2014 establishments in the Philippines